Robert Jennings may refer to:

 Robert Jennings (cricketer) (born 1977), English cricketer
 Robert Jennings (rugby league) (born 1996), Australian rugby league player
 Robert R. Jennings, president of Alabama Agricultural and Mechanical University and Lincoln University of Pennsylvania
 Robert Yewdall Jennings (1913–2004), British jurist
 Robert Jennings, writer and actor in Annoying Orange